Coonskin is a 1975 American live-action/animated satirical crime film written and directed by Ralph Bakshi. The film references the  Uncle Remus folk tales, and satirizes the blaxploitation film genre as well as Disney's racially controversial film Song of the South, also adapted from the Uncle Remus folk tales. The film's narrative concerns three anthropomorphic Uncle Remus characters, Br'er Rabbit (referred to as Brother Rabbit), Br'er Fox (referred to as Preacher Fox), and Br'er Bear (referred to as Brother Bear). They rise to the top of the organized crime racket in Harlem, encountering corrupt law enforcement, con artists, and the Mafia, in a satire of both racism within the Hollywood film system, and America itself. The film stars Philip Thomas, Charles Gordone, Barry White, and Scatman Crothers, all of whom appear in both live-action and animated sequences.

Originally produced under the titles Harlem Nights and Coonskin No More... at Paramount Pictures, Coonskin encountered controversy before its original theatrical release when the Congress of Racial Equality accused the film of being racist. When the film was released, Bryanston gave it limited distribution and it initially received mixed reviews. Later re-released under the titles Bustin' Out and Street Fight, Coonskin has since been re-appraised, recontextualizing the film as the condemnation of racism that the director intended, rather than a product of a racist imagination, as its detractors had claimed. A New York Times review said, "Coonskin could be Ralph Bakshi's masterpiece." Bakshi has stated that he considers Coonskin to be his best film.

Plot
In a small town in Oklahoma, Sampson (Barry White) and the local Preacher (Charles Gordone) plan to bust out their friend Randy (Philip Michael Thomas) from prison. As they rush to the prison, the two are stopped by a roadblock and have a shootout with the police. Meanwhile, Randy and another cellmate named Pappy (Scatman Crothers) escape from inside the prison and wait for Sampson and the Preacher to help them get out. While waiting for them, Randy unwillingly listens to Pappy tell a story about three guys that resemble Randy and his friends. Pappy's story is told in animation set against live-action background photos and footage.

Brother Rabbit (Philip Michael Thomas), Brother Bear, and Preacher Fox (Barry White and Charles Gordone) are forced to pack up and leave their Southern settings after the bank mortgages their home and sells it to a man who turns it into a brothel, only to run off with the trio's money. The sheriff and deputy arrived as customers only to find that one of the prostitutes was the sheriff's daughter. After shooting his deputy in rage, the sheriff turned his gun on Rabbit, who threw a knife killing the sheriff. The trio ran off deciding to move to Harlem, "home to every black man". When they arrive, Rabbit, Bear, and Fox find that it is not all that it is made out to be. They encounter a con man named Simple Savior, an obese and phony revolutionary leader who claims to be the cousin of "Black Jesus", and that he gives his followers "the strength to kill whites". In a flashy stage performance in his "church", Savior acts out being brutalized by symbols of black oppression—represented by images of John Wayne, Elvis Presley, and Richard Nixon, before asking his parishioners for "donations". Rabbit and his friends quickly realize that Savior's "revolution" is merely a money-making scam. Rabbit openly steals a large portion of the donation money, prompting Savior to try to have him killed. After Rabbit tricks his would-be murderers (in a paraphrasing of the story of Br'er Rabbit and the brier patch), he and Bear kill Savior. This allows Rabbit to take over Savior's racket, putting him in line to become the head of all organized crime in Harlem. Rabbit lays out his plan to keep all organized crime money in Harlem. But first, he has to get rid of a few other opponents. Savior's former partners tell Rabbit they will join him but only if he can kill his opponents; otherwise they will kill him instead.

Rabbit first goes up against Managan (Frank de Kova), a virulently racist and homophobic police officer and bagman for the Mafia, who demonstrates his contempt for African-Americans in various ways, including a refusal to bathe before an anticipated encounter with them (he believes that they are not worth it). When Managan finds out that Rabbit has been taking his payoffs, he and his cohorts, Ruby (Frank de Kova) and Bobby, are led to a nightclub called "The Cottontail". A black stripper distracts him while an LSD sugar cube is dropped into his drink. Managan, while under the influence of his spiked drink, is then maneuvered into a sexual liaison with a stereotypically effeminate gay man, and then shoved into women's clothing representative of the mammy archetype, adorned in blackface, and shoved out to the back of the club, where he discovers that Ruby and Bobby are dead. While recovering from being drugged, he fires his gun randomly in a fit of madness, and is brutally shot to death by the arriving police (who were either called in or alerted by the gunshots going off) after shooting one of the officers dead in his stupor. All of Harlem celebrated the death of Managan.

Rabbit's final target is the Godfather (Al Lewis), a grotesque crime boss who lives in the subway with his wife, daughter, and his cross-dressing, gay (and possibly incestuous) sons. The contract for killing Rabbit is given to his oldest and (possibly) only straight son, Sonny (Richard Paul). Arriving outside Rabbit's nightclub in blackface and clothing representative of minstrel show stereotypes, Sonny attempts to kill Rabbit, but Bear defends Rabbit, at the cost of getting shot by Sonny several times. When Sonny then attempts to escape in his car, he is shot multiple times by Rabbit before crashing into a wall and dying in the subsequent explosion. Rabbit then helps the injured Bear to safety. Sonny's body is cremated and taken back home, where his mother weeps over his ashes. She then tries to kill the Godfather in revenge for her son's death, only to be shot and killed by one of his henchmen, Mario the clown.

During his recovery, Bear becomes torn between staying with Rabbit or starting a new crime-free life. Bear decides to look for Fox in order to seek his advice. Upon arriving at Fox's newly acquired brothel, Bear is "married" to a girl that he, Fox, and Rabbit met during the fight with Savior's men. Under the advisement of Fox, Bear becomes an undefeated heavy weight boxer for the Mafia. Soon an invitation was sent to Rabbit to challenge a fighter against Bear. During the fight at the Godfather's lair, Rabbit sets up a melting imitation of himself made out of tar. As the Godfather and Mafiosos take turns stabbing at the "tar rabbit", they become stuck together. Rabbit leaves a bomb next to them and then he, Bear, Fox, and the opponent boxer rush out of the boxing arena as it blows up; vaporizing the Godfather and his associates. As they drove through the streets of Harlem, Bear was angry that Rabbit and Fox had planned everything and not tell Bear about it. The trio laughed knowing that it all worked out.

The live-action story ends with Randy and Pappy escaping from the prison with the aid of Sampson and the Preacher who finally arrive while being shot at by various white cops, but managing to make it out alive.

The main plot of the film is interspersed with animated vignettes depicting a white, blonde, large-breasted "Miss America" (Jesse Welles) who serves as a personification of the United States. In each of these short scenes, she seduces a black man (meant to depict the African-American populace), only to instead beat or kill him.

Cast
 Philip Michael Thomas as Randy
 Barry White as Sampson
 Charles Gordone as Preacherman
 Scatman Crothers as Pappy

Voices
 Philip Michael Thomas as Brother Rabbit
 Barry White as Brother Bear
 Charles Gordone as Preacher Fox
 Scatman Crothers as Old Man Bone / Additional Voices
 Danny Rees as Mario the Clown
 Buddy Douglas as Referee
 Jim Moore as The Mime
 Al Lewis as The Godfather
 Richard Paul as Sonny
 Frank de Kova as Managan / Ruby
 Ralph Bakshi as Cop with Megaphone
 Theodore Wilson and Scatman Crothers as Minstrel
 Jesse Welles as Marrigold / Miss America

Production
During the production of Heavy Traffic, filmmaker Ralph Bakshi met and developed an instant friendship with producer Albert S. Ruddy during a screening of The Godfather, and pitched Harlem Nights, a satirical adaptation of the Uncle Remus storybook, to Ruddy. In 1973, production of Harlem Nights began, with Paramount Pictures (where Bakshi once worked as the head of its cartoon studio) originally attached to distribute the film. Bakshi hired several black animators to work on Harlem Nights, including graffiti artists, at a time when black animators were not widely employed by major animation studios. Production concluded in the same year. During production, the film went under several titles, including Harlem Days and Coonskin No More...

Coonskin uses a variety of racist caricatures from blackface minstrelsy and darky iconography, including stereotypes featured in Hollywood films and cartoons. In the book That's Blaxploitation! Roots of the Baadasssss 'Tude (Rated X by an All-Whyte Jury), Darius James writes that "Bakshi pukes the iconographic bile of a racist culture back in its stupid, bloated face, wipes his chin and smiles Dirty Harry style. [...] He subverts the context of Hollywood's entire catalogue of racist black iconography through a series of swift cross-edits of original and appropriated footage." The film also features equally exaggerated portrayals of white Southerners, Italians, and homosexuals. The depiction of Jewish characters stems from stereotypes portrayed in Nazi propaganda, including The Eternal Jew.

In his review for The Hollywood Reporter, Arthur Knight wrote "Coonskin is not anti-black. Nor is it anti-Jewish, anti-Italian, or anti-American, all of whom fall prey to Bakshi's wicked caricaturist's pen as intensely as any of the blacks in his movie. What Bakshi is against, as this film makes abundantly clear, is the cheats, the rip-off artists, the hypocrites, the phonies, the con men, and the organized criminals of this world, regardless of race, color, or creed." The film is most critical in its portrayal of the Mafia. According to Bakshi, "I was incensed at all the hero worship of those guys in The Godfather; Pacino and Caan did such a great job of making you like them. [...] One thing that stunned me about The Godfather movie: here's a mother who gives birth to children, and her husband essentially gets all her sons killed. In Coonskin, she gets her revenge, but also gets shot. She turns into a butterfly and gets crushed. [...] These [Mafia] guys don't give you any room."

The live-action sequences feature singers Barry White and Scatman Crothers, actor and playwright Charles Gordone, and actors Philip Michael Thomas, Danny Rees, and Buddy Douglas. Thomas, Gordone, and White also provide the voices of the film's main animated characters. In the film's ending credits, the actors were only credited for their live-action roles, and all voice actors who did not appear in the live-action sequences were left uncredited. Among the voices featured in the film was Al Lewis, best known for appearing as Grandpa on The Munsters. Bakshi also worked with Gordone on the film Heavy Traffic, and worked with Thomas again on the film Hey Good Lookin'. The film's opening credits feature a long take of Scatman Crothers performing a song on vocals and guitar called "Coonskin No More".

Coonskin uses a variety of different styles of artwork, filmmaking and storytelling techniques. Film critic Leonard Maltin wrote that Coonskin "remains one of [Bakshi's] most exciting films, both visually and conceptually." Darius James writes that Coonskin "reads like an Uncle Remus folktale rewritten by Chester Himes with all the Yoruba-based surrealism of Nigerian author Amos Tutuola." The film directly references the original African folk tales that the Uncle Remus storybooks were based on in two scenes that are directly reminiscent of the stories The Briar Patch and The Tar Baby. Writer and former pimp Iceberg Slim is briefly referenced in the dialogue of Preacher Fox, and the Liston–Ali fights are referenced in the film's final act, in which Brother Bear, like Sonny Liston, is sold out to the Mafia. The film also features a pastiche of cartoonist George Herriman and columnist Don Marquis' "archy and mehitabel", in a monologue about a cockroach that leaves the woman who loves him. Bakshi has stated that Herriman, a Biracial American Creole, is his favorite cartoonist.

Release

When the film was finished, a showing was planned at the Museum of Modern Art. However, the Congress of Racial Equality (CORE) surrounded the building, in a protest led by Elaine Parker. Gregg Kilday of the Los Angeles Times interviewed Larry Kardish, a museum staff member, and Kardish recalled that "About halfway into the film about ten members of CORE showed up. They walked up and down the aisles and were very belligerent. In my estimation they were determined not to like the film. Apparently some of their friends had read the script of the movie and in their belief it was detrimental to the image of blacks [...] The question-and-answer session with Bakshi that followed quickly collapsed into the chaos of a shouting match." Animation historian Jerry Beck did not recall any disturbance during the screening, but said there were racist catcalls during the question-and-answer session, and Bakshi's talk was cut short. "It wasn't much of a madhouse, but it was kind of wild for the Museum of Modern Art."

Following the showing, the Paramount Building in New York City was picketed by CORE. Elaine Parker, chairman of the Harlem chapter of CORE, had spoken out against the film in January 1975. She told Variety that the film "depicts us as slaves, hustlers and whores. It's a racist film to me, and very insulting." The Los Angeles chapter of CORE demanded that Paramount not release the film, claiming that it was "highly objectionable to the black community." The NAACP had written a letter describing the film as a difficult satire, but supported it.

A New Distributor

With Paramount's permission, Bakshi and Ruddy were contractually released, and the Bryanston Distributing Company was made as the new distributor for the film. Ironically, two weeks after the film opened, the distributor went bankrupt. According to a May 1975 issue of The Hollywood Reporter, Ben Gage was hired to re-record some of Barry White's voice tracks, in order to remove "racist references and vulgarity." Coonskin was given limited distribution, advertised as a blaxploitation film. Roger Ebert wrote in his review of the film:

Coonskin is said by its director to be about blacks and for whites, and by its ads to be for blacks and against whites. Its title was originally intended to break through racial stereotypes by its bluntness, but now the ads say the hero and his pals are out "to get the Man to stop calling them coonskin." The movie's original distributor, Paramount, dropped it after pressure from black groups. Now it's being sold by Bryanston as an attack on the system. [...] Coonskin is provocative, original and deserves better than being sold as the very thing it's not.

In a 1982 article published in The Village Voice, Carol Cooper wrote "Coonskin was driven out of theaters by a misguided minority, most of whom had never seen the film. CORE's pickets at Paramount's Gulf and Western headquarters and, later, a few smoke bombs lobbed into packed Broadway theaters were enough; theater owners were intimidated, and the auxiliary distributor, Bryanston, couldn't book the film."

Critical response
Initial reviews of the film were mixed. Playboy said of the film, "Bakshi seems to throw in a little of everything and he can't quite pull it together." A review published in The Village Voice called the film "the product of a crippled hand and a paralyzed mind." Arthur Cooper wrote in Newsweek, "[Bakshi] doesn't have much affection for man or woman kind—black or white." Eventually, positive reviews appeared in The New York Times, The Hollywood Reporter, the New York Amsterdam News (an African American newspaper), and elsewhere, but the film died at the box office. Richard Eder of The New York Times wrote, "[Coonskin] could be his masterpiece [...] a shattering successful effort to use an uncommon form—cartoons and live action combined—to convey the hallucinatory violence and frustration of American city life, specifically black city life [...] lyrically violent, yet in no way [does it] exploit violence." Variety called the film a "brutal satire from the streets. Not for all tastes [...] not avant-garde. [...] The target audience is youth who read comics in the undergrounds." A reviewer for The Los Angeles Herald Examiner wrote "Certainly, it will outrage some and indeed it's not Disney. I liked it. The dialogue it has obviously generated—if not the box office obstacles—seems joltingly healthy."

Stanley Kauffmann of The New Republic wrote "Coonskin is a flawed but fierce little work of art, at a high level of imaginative energy and with some touches of brilliance".

Legacy
Coonskin was later re-released under the title Bustin' Out, but it was not a success. In 2003, the Online Film Critics Society ranked the film as the 97th greatest animated film of all time. Coonskin was released on VHS by Academy Entertainment in late 1987, and later by Xenon Entertainment Group in the 1990s, both under the re-release title, Street Fight. The 1987 edition carried the disclaimer, "Warning: This film offends everybody!".

In 2010, Shout! Factory announced that Coonskin would be released on DVD in November 2010, intending to release it with a reversible cover with both titles of the film, but the release was cancelled due to a legal issue involving ownership of the rights to the film, resolved with Xenon's eventual DVD release in 2012. The 2012 release was the first official home video release to carry the film's original title. In September 2012, Bakshi incorporated animation from Coonskin into a new short film, Trickle Dickle Down, criticizing Republican presidential candidate Mitt Romney.

See also
 List of American films of 1975

References

Notes

External links

 
 
 
 
 

1975 films
1975 animated films
1970s American animated films
1970s crime films
1970s satirical films
American adult animated films
African-American animated films
African-American-related controversies in film
African American–Jewish relations
American films with live action and animation
American independent films
American satirical films
Animated films about rabbits and hares
Animated films about bears
Animated films about foxes
Blaxploitation films
1970s English-language films
Films about African-American organized crime
Films about race and ethnicity
Films about racism
Films directed by Ralph Bakshi
Films scored by Chico Hamilton
Animated films set in New York City
Films shot in New York City
Films about the American Mafia
Film controversies
Race-related controversies in film
Race-related controversies in animation
1975 drama films
Films with screenplays by Ralph Bakshi
Br'er Rabbit
Censored films